Casamance (Wolof: Kasamansa; ;  or Casamança ) is the area of Senegal south of the Gambia, including the Casamance River. It consists of the Lower Casamance (Basse Casamance, Baixa Casamança—i.e. Ziguinchor Region) and the Upper Casamance (Haute Casamance, Alta Casamança—i.e. Kolda Region and Sédhiou Regions). The largest city of Casamance is Ziguinchor.

Peoples 
Casamance is mainly inhabited by the Jola and Bainuk. Significant minority populations include the Balanta, Mande and Fulani. Casamance is religiously diverse, with the inhabitants practicing Islam, Christianity, and traditional African religions.

History

According to local legends, the Jola and Bainuk people are said to have inhabited Casamance for over a thousand years. Jola leaders ruled portions of Casamance, frequently under the nominal rule of Wolof and Serer kingdoms to the north. From the 15th to 18th century, the Bainuk Kasa kingdom located in the Lower Casamance was the dominant state in the south. In the 15th century, Portuguese slave traders and navigators established a trading station in the area. They also formed trade relations with local Jola chiefs and the king of Kasa.

The Casamance was subject to both French and Portuguese colonial efforts before a border was negotiated in 1888 between the French colony of Senegal and Portuguese Guinea (now Guinea-Bissau) to the south. Portugal lost possession of Casamance, then the commercial hub of its colony. Casamance, to this day, has preserved the local variant of Upper Guinea Creole known as Ziguinchor Creole, and the members of the deep-rooted Creole community carry Portuguese surnames like Da Silva, Carvalho and Fonseca. The historical ties to Portugal were a factor in Senegal's decision to seek membership of the Community of Portuguese Language Countries (CPLP), becoming an associate observer in 2008. Interest in Portuguese heritage has been revived in order to exert a distinct identity, particularly in Baixa Casamança.

Bissau-Guineans are also present in the region, as expatriates, immigrants, and refugees from the poverty and instability that since long affects the neighbouring country, including the 1998–1999 Guinea-Bissau Civil War.

Separatist movement

Though the Jola are the dominant ethnic group in the Casamance, they represent only 4% of the total population of Senegal. The Jola's sense of economic disenfranchisement within greater Senegal contributed to the founding of a separatist movement advocating the independence or autonomous administrative division of the Casamance, the Movement of Democratic Forces of Casamance (MFDC), in 1982.

The MFDC's armed wing was established in 1985, and in 1990 the Casamance conflict began: a low-level insurgency led by the MFDC against the government of Senegal. The conflict has been characterized by sporadic violence and frequent but unstable ceasefire agreements. An illegal shipment of weapons hailing from Iran was seized in Lagos, Nigeria in October 2010, and the Senegalese government suspected the MFDC of having been the intended recipient of the weapons. Senegal recalled its ambassador to Tehran over the incident.

Geography and climate

The region is low-lying and hot, with some hills to the southeast. The entire Casamance region experiences a tropical savanna climate, with average rainfall greater than the rest of Senegal.

Economy
The economy of the Casamance relies largely on rice cultivation and tourism. It also has excellent beaches along its coastline, particularly at Cap Skirring.

Ecology

Tree cover in Casamance is severely threatened by illegal logging.

References

 Vincent Foucher, "Church and nation. The Catholic contribution to war and peace in Casamance (Senegal)", LFM. Social Sciences and Missions N°13/October 2003

External links

 Casamance.net 
 Oxfam America, Background on the Casamance Conflict
 Alassane Diop, Weblog Commentary

 
Geography of Senegal
Separatism in Senegal